Fernando Arturo de Meriño y Ramírez (January 9, 1833 in Antonsí – August 20, 1906) was a Dominican priest and politician. He served as President of the Dominican Republic from September 1, 1880, until September 1, 1882. He served as the President of Chamber of Deputies of the Dominican Republic in 1878 and 1883. He was later made an archbishop.

References

External links and additional sources
 (for Chronology of Bishops)
 (for Chronology of Bishops)

|-

1833 births
1906 deaths
19th-century Dominican Republic politicians
Presidents of the Dominican Republic
Presidents of the Chamber of Deputies of the Dominican Republic
Roman Catholic archbishops of Santo Domingo
People from Santo Domingo
20th-century Roman Catholic archbishops in the Dominican Republic
Dominican Republic Roman Catholic archbishops